Bourama Fomba (born 10 July 1999) is a Malian professional footballer who plays as a defender who plays for Levadia Tallinn. In his career, Fomba also played for Étoiles du Mandé, Ceahlăul Piatra Neamț and Politehnica Iași.

References

External links
 
 

1999 births
Living people
Sportspeople from Bamako
Malian footballers
Association football defenders
Liga I players
CSM Ceahlăul Piatra Neamț players
FC Politehnica Iași (2010) players
AFC Chindia Târgoviște players
FC Oleksandriya players
FC Minsk players
FCI Levadia Tallinn players
Malian expatriate footballers
Malian expatriate sportspeople in Romania
Malian expatriate sportspeople in Ukraine
Expatriate footballers in Romania
Expatriate footballers in Ukraine
Expatriate footballers in Belarus
Expatriate footballers in Estonia
21st-century Malian people
Malian expatriate sportspeople in Belarus
Malian expatriate sportspeople in Estonia
Meistriliiga players